Antonovsky is a Slavic surname according to Slavic naming conventions.  Notable people with this name include the following:

Aaron Antonovsky (1923–1994), American sociologist
Ilya Antonovsky (born 1989), Russian ice hockey player

See also

Patronymic surnames